Valley of Peace may refer to:
 Valley of Peace, Belize, a village in Cayo District, Belize
 Valley of Peace (film), a 1956 Yugoslavian war film 
 Valley of Peace initiative, an effort to promote economic cooperation between Israel, Jordan, and Palestine
 Wadi-us-Salaam, an Islamic cemetery located in Najaf, Iraq